Yasmin Khan is a historian of British India and Associate Professor of History at Kellogg College, Oxford.

Education and career 
Born in 1977 to Pakistani and Anglo-Irish parents in Kingston-upon-Thames, Khan completed her BA in history at St Peter's College, Oxford. Khan completed her DPhil at St Anthony's College, Oxford in 2005 in Imperial and Commonwealth History.

Khan became a lecturer at the University of Edinburgh in 2004 and a Senior Lecturer in Politics and International Relations at Royal Holloway, University of London in 2007 before moving to Kellogg College, Oxford as Associate Professor of History in 2012. Khan's work focuses on decolonisation, British migration histories, British Indian history, the Second World War and the End of Empire.

Khan is an editor of History Workshop Journal and a trustee of the Charles Wallace India Trust.

Khan's publications include The Great Partition: The Making of India and Pakistan (2007), which won the Gladstone Prize from the Royal Historical Society and was long-listed for the Orwell Prize, and The Raj at War: A People's History of India's Second World War (2015). She has written for the Guardian newspaper, and appeared on Channel 4 News and BBC Radio.

Public appearances and media

In Our Time (BBC Radio 4 2012) 
Khan appeared on a programme discussing the life and work of Annie Besant.

A Passage to Britain (BBC 2 2018) 
Khan presented a three-part series for BBC 2 in 2018 based on ships' passenger lists between Britain and India to trace the stories of passengers during the three decades before Indian independence in 1947.

The first episode, based on the passenger list of the Viceroy of India, included the story of Mulk Raj Anand.

Britain’s Biggest Dig (BBC 2 2020) 
In 2020, Khan presented a three-part series with Professor Alice Roberts for BBC 2 on two major archeological digs carried out in London and Birmingham in preparation for building terminals for the HS2 high-speed railway.

Selected publications

References

1977 births
Living people
British people of Pakistani descent
21st-century British historians
Academics of the University of Oxford
Alumni of St Peter's College, Oxford
Alumni of St Antony's College, Oxford